Gnewitz is a municipality  in the Rostock district, in Mecklenburg-Vorpommern, Germany.

Located 30 kilometres east of Rostock the town's name comes from the Slavic Gnevu meaning the place of angry people. The town entered the historical record in 1297 in a local charter.

References